Oaklawn Manor is a plantation house located on the Bayou Teche in St. Mary Parish, Louisiana, United States, just outside of Franklin.  The house was built by Alexander Porter about 1837, and sold by his widow Mary Walton Porter following the Civil War as she was unable to operate the sugar plantation without slave labor.  The house is listed on the National Register of Historic Places.

See also
 National Register of Historic Places listings in St. Mary Parish, Louisiana

References

External links 
 Oaklawn Manor

Houses completed in 1837
Houses on the National Register of Historic Places in Louisiana
Houses in St. Mary Parish, Louisiana
Museums in St. Mary Parish, Louisiana
Historic house museums in Louisiana
National Register of Historic Places in St. Mary Parish, Louisiana